E. Mark Koenker (born September 11, 1947) is a Canadian former provincial politician and minister in the Lutheran Church of Canada. He was a New Democratic member of the Legislative Assembly of Saskatchewan from 1986 to 1999, representing the electoral districts of Saskatoon Sutherland and Saskatoon Sutherland-University.

References 

Living people
1947 births
Saskatchewan New Democratic Party MLAs
Politicians from Chicago
Canadian people of American descent